South Trees is a coastal industrial suburb of Gladstone in the Gladstone Region, Queensland, Australia.

Geography 
South Trees is a coastal suburb facing the Auckland Channel, a waterway separated from the Coral Sea by Facing Island. The suburb consists of three non-contiguous areas of island, including the land around Parsons Point to the west of the South Trees Inlet and two islands within the South Trees Inlet, the northern one called South Trees Island while the southern one is unnamed.

The suburb is used only for industrial purposes. There is a causeway bridge from Parsons Point to South Trees Island where the refinery's wharf and storage facility is located.

Road infrastructure
The Gladstone–Benaraby Road runs just inside or just outside the western boundary.

History 

The Queensland Alumina refinery was commissioned in 1967.

Economy 
The refinery has an annual capacity of 3,950,000 tonnes of alumina.

References 

Suburbs of Gladstone